Chinta (Malay:'Love') is a 1948 Singaporean romantic drama film directed by B. S. Rajhans and produced by Malay Film Productions. It was released on 31 October 1948.

Chinta was the first Malayan film released after the declaration of the Malayan Emergency, and also marks the first screen appearance of P. Ramlee. Ramlee also performed as a playback singer in the film, providing vocals in five songs for the lead actor Roomai Noor. It is the oldest surviving film of Malayan cinema.

Plot
A boat is caught in a huge tempest and sinks. Only King Kanchi (S. Roomai Noor) survives. A few fishermen find him on the shore and rescue him. The love story begins when Chinta (Siput Sarawak), a young village girl, takes care of him.

Cast
 Siput Sarawak as Chinta
 S. Roomai Noor as King Kanchi and Sanchi
 Ja'afar Wiryo as Camban
 Harris as Vidush
 P. Ramlee as Putar
 Suhara Effendi as Ruchi
 Norsiah
 Lelawati

References

External links
Chinta / 1948 - Filem Malaysia
Chinta / Love (1948) at the Singapore Film Locations Archive

1948 films
1948 romantic drama films
Malaysian black-and-white films
Singaporean black-and-white films
Malay Film Productions films
Films directed by B. S. Rajhans
Films shot in Singapore
Malaysian romantic drama films
Singaporean romantic drama films